Jay Neill (21 May 1932 – 14 June 2006) was an English variety performer and television actor who often appeared in comedic roles.

Born in London, Neill started work as a stage hand at the Chiswick Empire theatre before auditioning for a role within the Dior Dancers adagio act. The Dior Dancers went on to achieve considerable success on the international variety circuit in the 1950s appearing in Las Vegas, as well the Royal Command Performance.

After leaving the Dior Dancers, Neill moved on to a successful career as a television actor, appearing in television programmes such as Doctor Who, The Onedin Line, Fawlty Towers, Sykes, Terry and June and Upstairs, Downstairs.

He died in Twickenham, England, in 2006 at the age of 74.

Filmography

Doctor Who

The Enemy of the World (1967-1968) ... Guard - ucredited
Doctor Who and the Silurians (1970) ... Policeman - uncredited
Colony in Space (1971) ... IMC Security Guard - uncredited 
The Masque of Mandragora (1976) ... Pikeman
The Invisible Enemy (1977) ... Silvey
Underworld (1978) ... Guard Klimt
Grange Hill S4 E14 (1980) .. Child Molester

References

External links 
 

1932 births
2006 deaths
English male stage actors
English male television actors
Male actors from London
20th-century English male actors